Sawai Gandharva Bhimsen Festival edition of the festival is also held in Hyderabad, India at the historical Chowmahalla Palace.

History
It was organised for the first time in Hyderabad in February 2012. It is organised by Mohan Hemmadi and Abhijit Bhattacharjee. It was decided to make it an annual event in Hyderabad like the Pune edition, and possibly an all-night event.

Controversy
The festival started on a wrong note with police denying permission and the show on the first day had to be curtailed. And the police gave a limited permission till 10 p.m., making it difficult for artists to be accommodated well in stipulated time.

2012 festival
17 February 
 Shrinivas Joshi - Hindustani vocal
 Rajan and Sajan Mishra - Hindustani vocal
18 February
 Alarmel Valli (Bharatanatyam)
 Kumar Bose (Tabla)
 Ustad Shahid Parvez (Sitar)
 Pandit Ajoy Chakrabarty (vocal)
19 February
 Shobhana (Bharatanatyam)
 Pandit Shankar Ghosh (Tabla)
 Ganesh and Kumaresh (violin)
 Ronu Majumdar, Bickram Ghosh (fusion)

See also

References

Music festivals established in 2012
Hindustani classical music festivals
Festivals in Hyderabad, India